Chenoise-Cucharmoy is a commune in the Seine-et-Marne department in the Île-de-France région in north-central France. It was established on 1 January 2019 by merger of the former communes of Chenoise (the seat) and Cucharmoy.

See also
Communes of the Seine-et-Marne department

References

Communes of Seine-et-Marne
Communes nouvelles of Seine-et-Marne
2019 establishments in France
Populated places established in 2019